L. candida  may refer to:
 Laelia candida, a synonym for Laelia albida, an epiphytic orchid species found in Mexico
 Leptothyra candida, a sea snail species

See also
 Candida (disambiguation)